Lesotho is a mountainous, landlocked country located in Southern Africa. It is an enclave, surrounded by South Africa.

The most popular geographic fact about Lesotho, apart from its status as an enclave, is that it is the only independent state in the world that lies entirely above  in elevation. Because of its elevation, the country's climate is cooler than in most other regions at the same latitude. Its climate zone can be classified as continental.

Location
Lesotho is a country in Southern Africa, located at around 29°30' south latitude and 28°30' east longitude. Lesotho is completely surrounded by South Africa, making it one of only three countries in the world that are enclaved within another country; the other two are San Marino and Vatican City, both located within Italy. Lesotho's status as an enclave also means that it is landlocked and largely dependent on South Africa. The nearest major shipping port is Durban.

Physical geography

Lesotho can be roughly divided into three geographic regions: the lowlands, following the southern banks of the Caledon River, and in the Senqu river valley; the highlands formed by the Drakensberg and Maloti mountain ranges in the east and central parts of the country; and the foothills that form a divide between the lowlands and the highlands. Lesotho is the only independent state in the world that lies entirely above  in elevation. Over 80% of Lesotho lies above .

Even though very little of Lesotho is covered in water, the rivers that run across the country are an important part of Lesotho's economy. Much of the country's export income comes from water, and much of its power comes from hydroelectricity. The Orange River rises in the Drakensberg mountains in northeastern Lesotho and flows across the entire length of the country before exiting to South Africa at the Mohale's Hoek District in the southwest. The Caledon River marks the northwestern part of the border with South Africa. Other rivers include the Malibamatso, Matsoku and Senqunyane.

The bedrock of Lesotho belongs to the Karoo Supergroup, consisting mostly of shale and sandstone. Peatlands can be found in the highlands of Lesotho, most extensively in the mountainous escarpment near the country's eastern border. The summit of Thabana Ntlenyana is partially encircled by bogs.

Solifluction deposits, blockfields, blockstreams and stone garlands can be found across the higher portions of the Lesotho Highlands. These features were formed in connection to the periglacial conditions that prevailed during the last glacial period in the area.

Political geography

Lesotho is divided into 10 administrative districts, each with its own capital, called a camptown. The districts are further subdivided into 80 constituencies, which consist of 129 local community councils.

Districts (in alphabetical order):
Berea
Butha-Buthe
Leribe
Mafeteng
Maseru
Mohale's Hoek
Mokhotlong
Qacha's Nek
Quthing
Thaba-Tseka

Climate

Because of its altitude, the country remains cooler throughout the year than most other regions at the same latitude. Lesotho has a temperate climate, with hot summers and cold winters. Maseru and its surrounding lowlands often reach  in the summer.

Most of the rain falls as summer thunderstorms: 85% of the annual precipitation falls between the months of  October and April. The winters—between May and September are usually very dry. Snow is common in the deserts and low valleys between May and September; the higher peaks can experience occasional significant snowfall year-round. Annual variance in rainfall is quite erratic, which leads to periodic droughts in the dry season (May to September) and flooding, which can be severe in the rainy season (October–April).

Natural resources
 
Lesotho is poor in natural resources. Economically the most important resource is water. The Lesotho Highlands Water Project allows exporting water from the Malibamatso, Matsoku, Senqu and Senqunyane rivers to South Africa, while also generating hydroelectric power for Lesotho's needs. As of April 2008, the first phase of the project has been completed. The project already accounts for an estimated five percent of Lesotho's GDP, and when fully completed, it could account for as much as 20 percent.

The main mineral resource is diamonds from the Letseng diamond mine in the Maluti mountain range. The mine produces very few stones, but has the highest dollar ratio per carat of any diamond mine in the world. Other mineral resources include coal, galena, quartz, agate and uranium deposits, but their exploitation is not considered commercially viable. Clay deposits can be found in the country, and are used for producing tiles, bricks and other ceramics.

Much of the population engages in subsistence farming, even though only 10.71% of the country's surface is classified as arable land and 0.13% has permanent crops. Much of the land has been ruined by soil erosion. The most fertile farmlands are in the northern and central lowlands, and in the foothills between the lowlands and the mountains. Large tracts of the fertile farmland to the north of the country—in the Free State region of South Africa—were lost to European colonists in wars during the 19th century.

Extreme points
This is a list of the extreme points of Lesotho, the points that are farther north, south, east or west than any other location.

 Northernmost point - unnamed location on the border with Golden Gate National Park in South Africa immediately north-west of the village of Monontsa, In Butha-Buthe District
 Easternmost point - unnamed location on the border with South Africa immediately west of the South African mountain Giant's Castle, Mokhotlong District
 Southernmost point - Gairntoul mountain, Quthing District
 Westernmost point - unnamed location in the Caledon River on the border with South Africa, Mafeteng District

References